The 2016 Glastonbury Festival of Contemporary Performing Arts took place between 22 and 26 June.

Tickets
General Admission Tickets for the festival cost £228.

Weather
The weather was very wet on Wednesday 22 June with major traffic delays getting to the festival. Organisers said that rain and ground conditions had caused delays and urged people "not to set off".

Festival founder and Worthy Farm owner Michael Eavis later commented "I’ve never seen mud like it in the whole life. This is worse than 1997...In all 46 years, it hasn’t been as bad as this".

Line-up
Headlining the festival were Muse, Adele and Coldplay on the Friday, Saturday and Sunday respectively.

Live album

A live album of numerous performances at the festival entitled Stand As One was released in aid of Oxfam and their Refugee Crisis Appeal. It is also dedicated to the memory of Jo Cox. It was released as a digital download on 29 July 2016 and as a CD on 12 August 2016. Artists including Coldplay, Foals, Muse, The Last Shadow Puppets, Fatboy Slim, Wolf Alice, CHVRCHES, Jamie Lawson, Sigur Rós, Laura Mvula, Jack Garratt, The 1975, Years & Years, Editors, Two Door Cinema Club and John Grant feature on the album.

References

External links

2016 in British music
2016 in England
2010s in Somerset
2016
June 2016 events in the United Kingdom